Anthidium atripes is a species of bee in the family Megachilidae, the leaf-cutter, carder, or mason bees.

Synonyms
Synonyms for this species include:
Anthidium polingae Schwarz, 1931

References

atripes
Insects described in 1879
Taxa named by Ezra Townsend Cresson